The 2015 Powiat Poznański Open was a professional tennis tournament played on outdoor clay courts. It was the second edition of the tournament and part of the 2015 ITF Women's Circuit, offering a total of $75,000 in prize money. It took place in Sobota, Poland, on 27 July–2 August 2015.

Singles main draw entrants

Seeds 

 1 Rankings as of 20 July 2015

Other entrants 
The following players received wildcards into the singles main draw:
  Magdalena Fręch
  Natalia Siedliska
  Natalie Suk
  Nicole Vaidišová

The following players received entry from the qualifying draw:
  Ekaterina Alexandrova
  Martina Borecká
  Cristina Dinu
  Chloé Paquet

Champions

Singles

 Petra Cetkovská def.  Jeļena Ostapenko, 3–6, 7–5, 6–2

Doubles

 Kiki Bertens /  Richèl Hogenkamp def.  Cornelia Lister /  Jeļena Ostapenko, 7–6(7–2), 6–4

External links 
 2015 Powiat Poznański Open at ITFtennis.com
 Official website

2015 ITF Women's Circuit
2015
2015
2015 in Polish tennis
WSG Open